The PSA Women's Awards (formerly WISPA Awards between 2004 and 2011 and formerly WSA Awards between 2012 and 2013) are presented annually by the Professional Squash Association, the organization which organizes the women's world squash circuit.

WISPA Awards 2004-2011

WSA Awards 2012-2013

PSA Awards 2014-present

See also
 Official Women's Squash World Ranking
 List of WSA number 1 ranked players

References

Squash (sport)
Squash records and statistics
Squash awards